Svitlana Anatoliïvna Spiriukhova (born 5 April 1982 in Mykolaiv) is a Ukrainian rower.

References 
 
 

1982 births
Living people
Ukrainian female rowers
Sportspeople from Mykolaiv
Olympic rowers of Ukraine
Rowers at the 2008 Summer Olympics
World Rowing Championships medalists for Ukraine
European Rowing Championships medalists
21st-century Ukrainian women